Justin Adriel de Castro is a Filipino student, vendor, and public speaker. He is best known for establishing The boy who cried books, which he began at age 19 selling books on sidewalks in Quezon City, Philippines, which he started to support his tertiary education. His venture became well known in social media, and has been featured on GMA News and Public Affairs' program Reel Time.

References 

Filipino Internet celebrities
Living people
Year of birth missing (living people)
People from Quezon City